Twilight (Spanish: Crepúsculo) is a 1945 Mexican drama film directed by Julio Bracho and starring Arturo de Córdova, Gloria Marín and Julio Villarreal.

Synopsis
Shortly before leaving for a trip to Europe, the celebrated Doctor Alejandro Mangino sees his former girlfriend Lucía posing nude in an art class. He becomes infatuated with her once more, but after returning from Europe he finds she is married to his best friend, Ricardo. He tries desperately to avoid Lucía, but struggles to overcome his obsessive feelings. She entices him into having an affair with her, despite the concerns of Lucía's younger sister Cristina, who also has a crush on Doctor Mangino. Mangino is left in a state of psychological trauma when he has to operate on Ricardo to save his life.

Cast
 Arturo de Córdova as Alejandro Mangino  
 Gloria Marín as Lucía  
 Julio Villarreal as Maestro de psiquiatria  
 Manuel Arvide as Ricardo Molina 
 Octavio Martínez as Sebastián, mayordomo  
 Felipe Montoya as Primitivo  
 Manuel Noriega as Papá de Lucía  
 Jesús Valero as Escultor  
 Lilia Michel as Cristina 
 Lidia Franco as Mamá de Lucía  
 Carlos Aguirre as Raúl  
 María Gentil Arcos as Madre de Lucia  
 Francisco Jambrina as Doctor Díaz González  
 Chel López as Chofer  
 Luz María Núñez as Enfermera  
 Salvador Quiroz as José  
 Humberto Rodríguez as José, Conserje  
 Félix Samper as Invitado a reunión  
 Manuel Trejo Morales as Invitado a reunión  
 Armando Velasco as Conductor del tren

References

Bibliography 
 Spicer, Andrew. Historical Dictionary of Film Noir. Scarecrow Press, 2010.

External links 
 

1945 films
1945 drama films
Mexican drama films
1940s Spanish-language films
Films directed by Julio Bracho
Mexican black-and-white films
1940s Mexican films